La Granja is the local version of the reality show The Farm in Spain. Two seasons of the show were aired on Antena 3, in 2004 and 2005. The format would be brought back by rival channel Telecinco in 2011, under the title Acorralados, and once more by Telecinco in 2022 as Pesadilla en el paraíso.

Season 1 (2004)
The first season aired on Antena 3 from September 2004. It began on September 8, 2004, and ended on November 23, 2004, after 77 days of living in the farm. The show was presented by Terelu Campos, at the central studio, and Jaime Bores from The Farm.

Contestants

Nominations

Season 2 (2005)
The second season was shown from March 29, 2005, and ended on June 5, 2005, after 69 days of living in La Granja. This season was presented by Terelu Campos and Óscar Modegro.

Contestants

Nominations

Television series by Endemol
The Farm (franchise)
2004 Spanish television series debuts
2005 Spanish television series endings
Spanish reality television series